Bököny is a village in Szabolcs-Szatmár-Bereg county, in the Northern Great Plain region of eastern Hungary.

Geography

References

External links
https://archive.today/20130628220647/http://www.collinsmaps.com/maps/Hungary/Szabolcs-Szatmar-Bereg/Bokony/P434748.00.aspx

Populated places in Szabolcs-Szatmár-Bereg County